Tyrone Township is one of twelve townships in Franklin County, Illinois, USA.  As of the 2010 census, its population was 4,653 and it contained 2,202 housing units.

Geography

Cities, towns, villages
 Christopher (vast majority)
 North City
 Valier (west three-quarters)

Unincorporated towns
 Mulkeytown
 Urbain, Illinois|Urbain
(This list is based on USGS data and may include former settlements.)

Cemeteries
The township contains these seven cemeteries: Cook, Greenwood, Mulkeytown, Naylor, Old Mulkeytown, Reed and Ward.

Major highways
  Illinois Route 14
  Illinois Route 148
  Illinois Route 184

Rivers
 Little Muddy River

Lakes
 Christopher Lake
 Izaac Walton Lake

Demographics

School districts
 Christopher Community Unit School District 99
 Sesser-Valier Community Unit School District 196

Political districts
 Illinois' 12th congressional district
 State House District 117
 State Senate District 59

Historical Information
According to "The Heritage of Franklin County Illinois" by Susie M. Ramsey and Flossie P. Miller (1964), "Tyrone Township was named after an old steamboat. The first land entries were made by Levi Silkwood and John Kirkpatrick in 1831, and John Mulkey in 1833." (Pg. 16, 1993 Print Shop reprint edition)

References
 
 United States Census Bureau 2007 TIGER/Line Shapefiles
 United States National Atlas

 Ramsey, Susie M. and Flossie P. Miller. "The Heritage of Franklin County Illinois". (1964, Benton Evening News).

External links
 City-Data.com
 Illinois State Archives

Townships in Franklin County, Illinois
Townships in Illinois